Bendix Joachim Ebbell (1869 – 1937) was a Norwegian author.

He was born in Christiania. He is known for his works of young adult fiction; titles include Vi på løkken (1900), Gutter som blev mænd (1911), Veien mot nord (1925) and De som drog ut (1925). He also wrote the comedy Menneskebørn which was staged at the National Theatre in 1908.

He was married to Clara Thue Ebbell.

References

1869 births
1937 deaths
19th-century Norwegian novelists
20th-century Norwegian novelists
Norwegian writers of young adult literature
Writers from Oslo